The Association of Personal Historians (APH) was an international non-profit trade association dedicated to developing, supporting and marketing the work of self-employed writers and small businesses who are engaged in  preparing print, video, and audio memoirs recording the lives of individuals, families, and communities. Formed in the United States in 1995, it had a global membership of over 650 at its peak,  before dissolving in May 2017, due to "financial constraints and membership trends".

The APH's mission statement was to "support... its members in recording, preserving and sharing life stories of people, families, communities and organizations around the world."  According to the organization, its members "help other people create personal histories, including memoirs, video tributes, autobiographies, biographies, family histories, heritage cookbooks, community histories, corporate and organizational histories, legacy letters, and ethical wills."

Concept
Kitty Axelson-Berry founded the organization in 1995.  According to her, "personal historians will not only write, edit, and design your book to your specifications, they'll make it clear from the get-go that the books they produce are meant to be heirlooms rather than potential bestsellers."  Increasingly, many personal historians now make use of video and digital formats.   Journalist Chris Wright stated: "The majority of... clients are unabashedly ordinary, and they tell unabashedly mundane tales."

Personal historians record and present clients' memories and biographies as books, in audio or video formats, and/or as personal websites.  Prices are reported to vary widely, depending on the services offered in each case.  The services of personal historians are also used in preparing histories of businesses and other organizations, and by wealth management companies to help improve bonds with their potential clients.  Personal historians also provide input to publicly funded oral history projects.

Personal historians have been described as comprising "journalists, psychotherapists, social workers, nurses, videographers, gerontologists, and people from other helping or writing professions", as "retired teachers, journalists, genealogists, and therapists..." and as "social workers, journalists and others involved in communications... retirees who want to embark on a second career."  In each case they form " [g]enerally a one-person conglomerate of ghostwriter, editor, and publishing house...".

Personal history work has been reported to be booming in the US, as "a growing cottage industry of amateurs and professionals eager to preserve the experiences of older generations."  Paula Stahel, APH President at the time, said in 2008: "We're seeing an increase both in the number of people who want to do personal historian work and an increase in the number of elders who want to be sure their stories are handed down."

All APH members are expected to abide by the organization's code of ethics.  Practitioners often have training in skills such as interviewing techniques, desktop publishing, video and/or audio production, as well as some knowledge of geriatrics or other disciplines.

Governance and dissolution
The APH was governed by an elected, all-volunteer board of directors with overlapping two-year terms. The organization held an annual conference for its members. 

The 2017 Board of Directors cited decreasing membership and a growing trend towards online networking and collaboration as reasons for dissolution. In a letter to members, the 2017 Board wrote, 
"...APH has achieved its purpose many times over, which, as stated in our Bylaws, was to 'advance the profession of helping individuals, organizations, and communities preserve their histories, memories, and life stories.' APH has helped launch more than a thousand personal history businesses, and its members have produced many thousands of personal history works that will be part of our world’s historical record. APH leaves the field at a time when a broader recognition of the importance of saving life stories has emerged and is flourishing—and is widely known and communicated through the work of many other organizations and media outlets. APH has had a significant role in advancing that conversation. And it was our members, as individual practitioners of personal history, who achieved this in countless ways in countless communities, and we know you will continue to do so."

Resources
Former members of APH and current personal historians are encouraged to use the phrase "personal history" and "personal historian" in search engines in order to find relevant social media groups. Trade associations exist for genealogists, photo archivists, ghostwriters, editors, and biographers, among others.

Further reading
Writers and Editors blog (May 14, 2017) 
Writers and Editors blog (March 29, 2018) 
 My Words Are Gonna Linger: The Art of Personal History, ed. Paula Stallings Yost and Pat McNees (Personal History Press 2009). 
 Start & Run a Personal History Business: Get Paid to Research Family Ancestry and Write Memoirs , by Jennifer Campbell (Self-Counsel Press 2010). 
 Tugend, Alina (August 31, 2016) "Have a Story to Tell? Your Personal Memoirist Is Here". The New York Times.
 Magagnini, Stephen (October 25, 2015) "Writing Down Family Histories As Baby Boomers Look Back". The Sacramento Bee.

See also
 Oral History Association

References

External links
  PersonalHistorians.org, the Association of Personal Historians official website
  Sarah White, "When APH Died, Doves Cried", May 17, 2017

Oral history
Family history
Writers' organizations
International trade associations
Arts and media trade groups